Biscutella didyma, commonly known as buckler mustard, is a species of annual herb in the family Brassicaceae. They have a self-supporting growth form and simple, broad leaves and dry fruit. Flowers are visited by Hebecnema fumosa, nomad bees, syrphid flies, and Chrysotoxum intermedium. Individuals can grow to 4 cm.

Sources

References 

didyma
Flora of Malta